Microclytus gazellula is a species of longhorn beetle in the Cerambycinae subfamily. It was described by Haldeman in 1847. It is known from northeastern North America.

References

Anaglyptini
Beetles described in 1847